This article lists events that occurred during 1981 in Estonia.

Incumbents

Events
Estonian Philharmonic Chamber Choir was established.

Births
26 May – Eda-Ines Etti, Estonian singer and TV host
1 August – Vaiko Eplik, singer

Deaths
27 March – Jüri Kukk, Estonian freedom fighter

References

 
1980s in Estonia
Estonia
Estonia
Years of the 20th century in Estonia